Halicardia Dall, 1895 is a genus of bivalves in the family Verticordiidae.

Species 

 Halicardia angulata (Jeffreys, 1882)
 Halicardia carinifera (Locard, 1898)
 Halicardia flexuosa (A. E. Verrill and S. Smith, 1881)
 Halicardia gouldi (Dall, Bartsch and Rehder, 1938)
 Halicardia houbricki (Poutiers & F.R. Bernard, 1995)
 Halicardia maoria (Dell, 1978)
 Halicardia nipponensis (Okutani, 1957)
 Halicardia perplicata (Dall, 1890)
 Halicardia phillippinensis (Poutiers, 1981)

References 

Verticordiidae
Molluscs described in 1895
Bivalve genera